Robert C. Knapp is professor emeritus of classics at the University of California, Berkeley.

Early life
Raised in Mt. Pleasant, Michigan, Knapp earned his B.A degree from Central Michigan University in 1968, majoring in history and Spanish. In 1973 he completed his PhD in ancient history at the University of Pennsylvania. His dissertation, under Robert E. A. Palmer, was on the Roman experience in the Spanish peninsula, 218-100 B.C.

Career
Knapp worked for a short time in the classics department at Colby College and in the history department at the University of Utah. After that, he went to the classics department at the University of California, Berkeley, in 1974. He remained there until his retirement in 2006, eventually attaining the rank of professor. Besides teaching and doing research, he served in numerous administrative posts including as chairman of the classics department and the Department of East Asian Languages and Cultures, as dean in the College of Letters and Science, and chairman of the Berkeley faculty Senate.

Selected publications
 Aspects of the Roman Experience in Iberia, 206-100 B.C. 1980
 Roman Córdoba. 2011.
 Latin Inscriptions from Central Spain. 1992.
 Finis Rei Publicae: Eyewitnesses to the End of the Roman Republic. 1999. (with Pamela Vaughn)
 Barrington Atlas of the Greek and Roman World. 2000. (editor for Iberia)
 Nemea III: The Coins. 2004. (with John Mac Isaac)
 Invisible Romans Profile, 2011. 
 Clare 1865-1940. 2012. 
 Mystery Man. Gangsters, Oil, and Murder in Michigan. 2013.
The Dawn of Christianity People and Gods in a Time of Magic and Miracles. Harvard University Press, 2017.

References 

Year of birth missing (living people)
Living people
Classical scholars of the University of California, Berkeley
Central Michigan University alumni
University of Pennsylvania alumni
Colby College faculty
University of Utah faculty